Bassoues is a commune in the Gers department in southwestern France.

Geography
The Auzoue, a tributary of the Gélise, has its source in the southwestern part of the commune. The Guiroue, another tributary of the Gélise, flows north through the eastern part of the commune. The Barade, a stream, tributary of the Guirou, forms the commune's eastern border.

Population

See also
Communes of the Gers department

References

Communes of Gers